"From Raxacoricofallapatorius with Love" is a special one-off episode from Doctor Who spin-off The Sarah Jane Adventures. It was the first Doctor Who spin-off to produce a special for Comic Relief and was broadcast on 13 March 2009 as part of Red Nose Day 2009.

Plot
Sarah Jane, Luke, Clyde and Rani are talking to Mr Smith when suddenly there is a breach in the attic. Mr Smith identifies the disturbance as a teleport and a diplomat named Ranius (played by comedian Ronnie Corbett) appears. He states that he represents the Galactic Alliance and gives them all gifts for defending the Earth so valiantly. He then pulls up a chair to talk to them and experiences apparent flatulence. Sarah Jane, Clyde, Rani and Luke all notice the similarity of the constant flatulence with that of a Slitheen wearing a skin suit, which Ranius denies quite strongly. K9 materialises and confirms Mr Smith's identification, but Ranius states all dogs should be put on a lead and clamps K9.

After further interrogation, Ranius immobilises Sarah Jane's, Luke's, Clyde's and Rani's feet using the gifts he had given them and reveals himself to be a Slitheen after all, unzipping his forehead to reveal a diminutive Raxacoricofallapatorian and stating his plan to steal K9 and the information it contains. Thinking swiftly, Sarah Jane manages to use her sonic lipstick to release their feet clamps and clamp Ranius' feet. Clyde then throws Ranius' bowler hat at a switch on Mr Smith, teleporting Ranius away and releasing the clamp on K9.

Outside references
The script includes several references to The Two Ronnies. Corbett's character name, Rani, is a pun on Ronnie, highlighted when he claims that he and Sarah's human friend Rani Chandra could be classed as "The Two Ranis". The story Ambassador Rani tells is also a reference to The Two Ronnies – both the visual of Corbett sitting in the chair and his mention of "Fork Handles" (or Four Candles). Finally, at the end of the scene, Sarah Jane utters Ronnie Barker's catchphrase "...and it's goodnight from him".

The scene also makes two references to Red Nose Day. The gifts bestowed on Sarah and her friends are Comic Relief deely boppers, and the final shot of the scene is K-9 sporting a Red Nose.

References

External links

The Sarah Jane Adventures episodes
Films with screenplays by Gareth Roberts (writer)
2009 British television episodes
Doctor Who charity episodes
Slitheen television stories